The British athletic clubs league system is a series of interconnected leagues for British athletic clubs. Men and women are segregated.

Structure

The British Athletics League is a national league competition for senior men, consisting of 38 clubs across five divisions.
There is promotion and relegation within the league and the bottom two teams of the lowest division (Division 4) go into a qualifying competition with the top teams of the regional leagues.

The UK Women's Athletic League is a national league competition for senior women, consisting of 32 clubs across four divisions.
There is promotion and relegation within the league and the bottom two teams of the lowest division (Division 4) go into a qualifying competition with the top teams of the regional leagues.

The tables below shows the current structure of the system.

National League Structure

Regional League Structure

England

Wales

Scotland

External links
British Athletic League
UK Women's Athletic League
Southern Athletics League
Northern Athletics League
Midland Athletics League
Welsh Athletics League
Scottish Athletics League

Athletics competitions in England
Track and field in the United Kingdom